The UK-based Leeds Building Society had a presence in Ireland from 2006 until 2018. It offered mortgages up to 14 September 2009, with savings accounts available throughout the period. In 2017, it closed its savings operation to new customers. In July 2018, it gave notice to all savings customers that their accounts were to close in September. In October 2018, it sold its Irish mortgage book to Dilosk and these are now managed by Pepper Finance Corporation.

It is regulated by the UK Financial Conduct Authority and the Prudential Regulation Authority. It is also a member of the UK Financial Services Compensation Scheme.

In its last full year of operations, 2017, the society lost £1.2m on its Irish operations.

References

External links

Leeds Building Society

Building societies of the Republic of Ireland
Financial services companies of the Republic of Ireland
Financial services companies established in 2006
2018 disestablishments in Ireland
Irish companies established in 2006